Philippa Neville, Baroness Dacre (1386–after 1453) was the third daughter of Ralph Neville, 1st Earl of Westmorland, by his first wife, Margaret Stafford.

Marriage and issue
Sometime before 20 July 1399, she married Thomas Dacre, 6th Baron Dacre of Gilsland, born at Naworth Castle, Cumberland, on 27 October 1387, the son of William Dacre, 5th Baron Dacre of Gilsland, by Joan Douglas, the illegitimate daughter of Sir William Douglas, 1st Earl of Douglas.

They had seven sons and two daughters:
Sir Thomas Dacre (d. before 5 January 1458), who married Elizabeth Bowet, and by her had two daughters, Joan Dacre, suo jure 7th Baroness Dacre, wife of Richard Fiennes, and Philippa Dacre, wife of Sir Robert Fiennes.
Randolph Dacre, 1st Baron Dacre of the North, who married Eleanor FitzHugh, by whom he had no issue. He was slain at the Battle of Towton on 29 March 1461, and attainted, whereby his title was forfeited.
Humphrey Dacre, 1st Baron Dacre of Gilsland (d. 30 May 1485), who married Mabel Parr (d. 14 November 1508), and by her had six sons and three daughters.
Ralph Dacre.
Richard Dacre.
George Dacre.
John Dacre.
Joan Dacre, who married Thomas Clifford, 8th Baron de Clifford.
Margaret Dacre, who married John le Scrope.

Philippa's husband, Thomas Dacre, 6th Baron Dacre of Gilsland, died 5 January 1458. The date of Philippa's death is unknown, although she was living 8 July 1453.

Footnotes

References

External links
J.H. Garner genealogy pages

1386 births
1453 deaths
People from Staindrop
Daughters of British earls
Dacre
Philippa
Philippa
14th-century English women
14th-century English people
15th-century English women
15th-century English people